Pashto literature refers to literature and poetry in Pashto language. The history of Pashto literature spreads over five thousands years having its roots in the oral tradition of Tappa (Pashto: ټپه/لنډۍ). However, the first recorded period begins in 7th century with Amir Kror Suri (a warrior poet). Later, Pir Roshan (1526–1574), who founded his own Sufi school of thoughts and began to preach his beliefs. He gave Pashto prose and poetry a new and powerful tone with a rich literary legacy. Khair-ul-Bayan, oft-quoted and bitterly criticized thesis, is most probably the first book on Sufism in Pashto literature. Among his disciples are some of the most distinguished poets, writers, scholars and sufis, like Arzani, Mukhlis, Mirza Khan Ansari, Daulat and Wasil, whose poetic works are well preserved. Akhund Darweza (1533–1615), a popular religious leader and scholar gave a powerful counterblast to Bayazid’s movement in the shape of Makhzanul Islam. He and his disciples have enriched the Pashto language and literature by writing several books of prose.

Proverbs 
Here is a list of Pashto Proverbs:

Notable figures
 Amir Kror Suri, son of Amir Polad Suri, he was an 8th-century folk hero and king from the Ghor region of Afghanistan.
 Pir Roshan, Pashto poet known for assembling Pashtun armies to fight against the Mughal emperor Akbar; founded the 16th-century Roshanniya movement and wrote the Pashto book Khayr al-Bayān to present his philosophical ideas.
 Shaikh Mali, narrated the Yusufzai conquest of Swat, and devised rules for distribution of land and water rights which became known as da Shekh Mālī daftar.
 Khushal Khan Khattak, 17th-century warrior-poet who preached the unity of all Pashtuns.
 Rahman Baba (c. 1632 - c. 1706), one of the greatest Pashto poets of all time, whose works are as important to the Pashtun as William Shakespeare is to the English; his works are spiritual.
 Khan Abdul Ghani Khan, (c. 1914-1996), Pashtun philosopher and Pashto language poet, artist (painter and sculptor), writer and Pashtun nationalist politician of the 20th century. He was a son of Khan Abdul Ghaffar Khan and older brother of Khan Abdul Wali Khan. 
 Afzal Khan Khattak
 Ashraf Khan Khattak
 Ajmal Khattak
 Pareshan Khattak
 Khan Roshan Khan
 Nazoo Anaa 
 Ghani Khan
 Hamza Baba
 Kabir Stori
 Karwan
 Ahmad Shah Baba
 Shah Shuja
 Timur Shah 
 Abaseen Yousafzai
 Hamza Shinwari
 Matiullah Qureshi
 Riaz Tasneem
 Sahib Shah Sabir

See also

Pashtun culture
List of Pashto-language poets

References

External links
 Pasho Shayro Shayri at QuotePoetry.com

 Pasho Shayro Shayri at Khyber.org

 
Afghan literature
Pakistani poetry by language